I, Lucifer is the title of an action-adventure novel by Peter O'Donnell which was first published in 1967, featuring the character Modesty Blaise which O'Donnell had created for a comic strip several years earlier. It was the third novel to feature the character.

I, Lucifer introduces parapsychology, a theme that would recur in later books in the Modesty Blaise series; in the novel it is introduced in relation to Willie Garvin's ability to predict danger by way of his ears prickling (a trait introduced at the start of the comic strip), and a villain's ability to predict future events. The novel also introduces the secondary character Steven Collier, a parapsychologist, who would make numerous future appearances in both the comic strip and the novels. The titular character, depicted as an insane young man who believes himself to be the overlord of the underworld, nonetheless demonstrates the genuine ability to predict natural deaths.

Plot summary
Modesty Blaise and Willie Garvin are in Paris. Modesty is being wined and dined by René Vaubois, head of the Deuxième Bureau (the French Intelligence Service), on a floating restaurant on the Seine. René asks Modesty for advice regarding a new protection racket. High-level people worldwide are receiving death threats, and those who don't pay end up dead. The really crazy thing is that most of the deaths are apparently natural deaths.

Willie, waiting on the river bank for Modesty's return, encounters Chuli, a criminal whose speciality is planting bombs. René Vaubois' car has been wired with explosives. And when Modesty, Willie, René and Stephen Collier (making his first appearance) leave the scene they are followed by a car full of underworld killers, all bent on putting René down.

This is the start of a rather strange story about Lucifer, a "young man with a godlike body, dark hair and a ruined mind" who had been studying to go into the church when he was seduced by a woman and suffered a nervous breakdown, becoming convinced that he was the source of all sin, and therefore the devil himself. A pair of ageing puppeteers, Seff and Regina, unable to get work when the music halls closed down, turned to crime. After discovering Lucifer's uncanny ability to predict forthcoming natural deaths Seff has created an incredible worldwide protection racket.

The action heats up when Modesty is taken prisoner at their base on Sylt and a radio-controlled cyanide capsule is surgically implanted under her skin. The final confrontation takes place on a remote island in the Philippines. First Modesty and Willie are forced to fight a duel to the death against each other. Later the machine guns are blazing in a major battle between good guys and bad, with Modesty risking everything to try and save Lucifer.

1967 British novels
Modesty Blaise books
Fiction about the Devil
Souvenir Press books